Jack Melton Boardman, commonly known as John Boardman, (born September 8, 1932) is an American physicist. He is a former professor of physics at Brooklyn College; a noted science fiction fan, author and fanzine publisher; and a gaming authority.

Academic career 
Boardman earned his BA at the University of Chicago in 1952 and his MS from Iowa State University in 1956. He then attended Florida State University to begin his doctoral studies. However, he was expelled in 1957 due to his involvement with the Inter-Civic Council and more specifically for inviting three black Florida A&M exchange students to a Christmas party.

He ultimately received his PhD in physics at Syracuse University in 1962; his doctoral thesis was titled Quantization of the General Theory of Relativity. His publications include "Spherical Gravitational Waves" (a collaboration with Peter Bergmann, former research assistant to Albert Einstein), "Contributions to the Quantization Problem in General Relativity", and "The Normal Modes Of A Hanging Oscillator Of Order N".

Boardman and gaming 
Boardman was involved in early play-by-mail (PBM) for the Diplomacy game, and for a small fee he would send copies of each player's turns to every other player involved in a game. He is one of the most noted figures in the game of Diplomacy, having established the original play-by-mail setup in 1961, and also the system of numbering each game for statistical purposes. These numbers, known as Boardman Numbers, include the year and a letter indicating sequence.  For instance, 2004A was the first game started in 2004.

Boardman started the first successful postal Diplomacy zine, Graustark, in 1963 as an offshoot from his science fiction fanzine Knowable.  Soon Graustark grew from just a gameturn-report newsletter to a hobby activity similar to science fiction fanzines. Boardman continued to produce Graustark for almost 50 years, publishing issue 793 in June 2013.

Science fiction 
Boardman has long been an active member of science fiction fandom, famed for his strong political opinions; and has been the subject of at least two filksongs: "To John Boardman in Brooklyn" and "All Hail to the Fan John B." In addition to Knowable, his science fiction fanzines have included Dagon and Anakreon. He has also written at least two published fantasy stories, "Colon the Conqueror" (a Conan the Barbarian parody), published in the May 1958 issue of Fantastic Universe; and "The Testament of Snefru", published in the 1980 anthology The Spell of Conan (L. Sprague de Camp, ed.).

"The Asteroid Light" 
Boardman's 1961 filksong, "The Asteroid Light" (to the tune of the sea chanty "Eddystone Light") has been reprinted repeatedly, in venues ranging from science fiction anthologies (the 1972 anthology Futures Conditional) to Sing Out magazine (V. 9, #1, p. 24) to collections of protest music (Glazer, Tom. Songs of Peace, Freedom and Protest. New York: David McKay, 1970). It has also frequently been discussed in papers on filk music.

He also wrote a regular column, "Science for Science Fiction", for the first twelve issues of Ares magazine.

Personal life 
After having been a resident of the Flatbush neighborhood of Brooklyn, New York for almost half a century (his house was used as a set in Spike Lee's Malcolm X), Boardman now lives in Frederick, Maryland. Boardman's wife, Perdita, who was previously married to Ray Nelson, died on November 26, 2017 after a long battle with dementia.

References 

1932 births
21st-century American physicists
Brooklyn College faculty
Diplomacy (game)
Iowa State University alumni
Living people
People from Flatbush, Brooklyn
Syracuse University College of Arts and Sciences alumni
University of Chicago alumni
Scientists from New York (state)
20th-century American physicists